Dorah Sterne (1896 – April 9, 1994), born Dorah Heyman, was an American clubwoman and philanthropist.

Early life 
Dorah Heyman was born in Atlanta, Georgia, the daughter of Arthur Heyman and Minna Simon Heyman. Both of her parents were born in the American South. Her father was a lawyer. She graduated from Smith College in 1919.

Career 
In Birmingham, Alabama after she married, Sterne was involved with the League of Women Voters, and the Birmingham Little Theater. She served as commissioner of the Birmingham Girl Scout Council, president of the Birmingham branch of the American Association of University Women, and president of the Birmingham chapter of the National Council of Jewish Women. During World War II, the Sternes sponsored families of German Jewish refugees, and helped them settle in Alabama. The Sternes' philanthropic interests extended to libraries, museums, hospitals, mental health, and civil rights in Birmingham. Dorah Sterne took particular interest in prison reform, serving on the 1948 Prison Investigating Committee, and arranging for radios for women prisoners.

Sterne gave an oral history interview to the Birmingham Public Library in 1985. That same year, she was presented with the Smith College Medal, as a distinguished alumna.

Personal life 
In 1922, Dorah Heyman married banker Mervyn Hayden Sterne (1892–1973). They had one daughter, also named Dorah, called Dody (1933–1998). Dorah Sterne died in 1994, aged 98 years. The Sterne Family Papers are at the University of Alabama Birmingham Archives.

References

External links 

 Levy, Cynthia Betty. "You Can't Imagine This Life: Diaries and Letters of a Southern-Jewish Grande Dame, Josephine Joel Heyman, 1901-1993" (PhD. diss., Louisiana State University 1999). About Dorah Sterne's sister-in-law, Josephine Joel Heyman.

1896 births
1994 deaths
People from Atlanta
People from Birmingham, Alabama
Smith College alumni
Jewish women
American women philanthropists
American anti-poll tax activists
Activists from Georgia (U.S. state)
Activists from Alabama
Philanthropists from Georgia (U.S. state)
Philanthropists from Alabama
20th-century American philanthropists
20th-century women philanthropists